Giuseppe Accardi (born 7 March 1964 in Italy) is an Italian retired footballer.

References

Italian footballers
Living people
Association football defenders
Association football midfielders
1964 births
Ravenna F.C. players
Venezia F.C. players
Olbia Calcio 1905 players
Cavese 1919 players
Palermo F.C. players
S.S.D. Città di Campobasso players
U.S. Alessandria Calcio 1912 players
A.S.D. Licata 1931 players
Calcio Foggia 1920 players
Footballers from Palermo